Ron Robinson (born 1 January 1956 in San Francisco, California) is a former slotback and wide receiver who played six seasons in the Canadian Football League, mainly for the Montreal Concordes. He was a part of the BC Lions 1985 Grey Cup victory. Robinson played college football at Utah State University.

References

1956 births
Utah State Aggies football players
Calgary Stampeders players
Saskatchewan Roughriders players
Montreal Concordes players
BC Lions players
Canadian football slotbacks
Canadian football wide receivers
American players of Canadian football
Living people